Army Medical Colleges are the medical colleges run by the Bangladesh Army under the Bangladesh University of Professionals in different cantonments of Bangladesh. 

It refers to:

Army Medical College, Bogra, Bangladesh
Army Medical College, Chattogram, Bangladesh
Army Medical College, Cumilla, Bangladesh
Army Medical College, Jashore, Bangladesh
Rangpur Army Medical College, Bangladesh